This is a list of media related to the long-running series Legend of the Galactic Heroes.

Novels

Prequels and side stories

Short stories

Record of the Battle of Dagon (ダゴン星域会戦記)
Silver-White Valley (白銀の谷)
Disgrace (汚名)
Dream of the Morning, Song of Night (朝の夢、夜の歌)
Golden Wings (黄金の翼)

Manga

Anime series

Main OVA Series

Season 1

The 26-episode season 1 (or first part), released between December 1988 and June 1989, covers the volumes 1 and 2 of the original novels, adding some prequel stories (episodes 9 and 11) and original stories (parts of episodes 13 and 14).

1. Into the Eternal Night (永遠の夜の中で)
2. The Battle of Astarte (アスターテ会戦)
3. Birth of the 13th Fleet (第十三艦隊誕生)
4. Empire’s Afterglow (帝国の残照)
5. The Kastrop Rebellion (カストロプ動乱)
6. The Knights of the Rose (薔薇の騎士)
7. Iserlohn Taken! (イゼルローン攻略!)
8. Cool, Clear Artificial Eyes (冷徹なる義眼)
9. The Klopstock Incident (クロプシュトック事件)
10. Jessica’s Battle (ジェシカの戦い)
11. The Actress Exits (女優退場)
12. Invasion of the Imperial Territory (帝国領侵攻)
13. When the Rain of Grief Comes (愁雨来たりなば)
14. Liberation of the Frontier Zone (辺境の解放)
15. The Battle of Amlitzer Starzone (アムリッツァ星域会戦)
16. New Trends (新たなる潮流)
17. Before the Storm (嵐の前)
18. The Lippstadt Conspiracy (リップシュタットの密約)
19. The Yang Fleet Goes Out (ヤン艦隊出動)
20. Bloodshed in Space (流血の宇宙)
21. The Battle of Doria Starzone, then… (ドーリア星域会戦、そして…)
22. Courage and Allegiance (勇気と忠誠)
23. The Downfall of the Golden Tree (Goldenbaum) (黄金樹（ゴールデンバウム）は倒れた)
24. Whose Victory? (誰が為の勝利)
25. The Day before Destiny (運命の前日)
26. Farewell, the Old Days (さらば、遠き日)

Season 2

The 28-episode season 2 (or second part), released between June 1991 and February 1992, covers the volumes 3 to 5 of the original novels.

27. First Battle (初陣)
28. Portraits (肖像)
29. One Tiny Thread (細い一本の糸)
30. Lost Things (失われたもの)
31. The Inquiry Committee (査問会)
32. War without Weapons (武器なき戦い)
33. Fortress versus Fortress (要塞対要塞)
34. Repatriation (帰還)
35. Determination and Ambition (決意と野心と)
36. Thunder (雷鳴)
37. Abduction of the Young Emperor (幼帝誘拐)
38. The Arrow Is Released (矢は放たれた)
39. The Journey Begins (ひとつの旅立ち)
40. Julian’s Journey, Mankind’s Journey (ユリアンの旅、人類の旅)
41. Operation Twilight of the Gods (Ragnarok) (作戦名『神々の黄昏（ラグナロック）』)
42. Invitation to a Requiem (鎮魂曲（レクイエム）への招待)
43. Gjallahorn’s Roar (ギャラルホルンは鳴った)
44. Phezzan Occupied (フェザーン占領)
45. The Cold Wave Arrives (寒波至る)
46. Admiral Yang’s Ark Fleet (ヤン提督の箱舟隊)
47. Seeking a Free Universe (自由の宇宙を求めて)
48. The Double-Headed Snake: the Decisive Battle of Rantemario (双頭の蛇～ランテマリオの決戦～)
49. The Darkness before Dawn… (闇が深くなるのは…)
50. Battle after Battle (連戦)
51. The Battle of Vermillion (first part) (バーミリオンの死闘（前編）)
52. The Battle of Vermillion (second part) (バーミリオンの死闘（後編）)
53. Sudden Change (急転)
54. Long Live the Emperor! (Sieg Kaiser) (皇帝ばんざい！（ジーク・カイザー）)

Season 3

The 32-episode season 3 (or third part), released between July 1994 and February 1995, covers the volumes 6 to 8 of the original novels.

55. After the Ceremony, the Curtain Rises Again… (儀式から再び幕は上がり…)
56. To Earth (地球へ)
57. The Künmel Incident (キュンメル事件)
58. Visitors (訪問者)
59. Past, Present and Future (過去と現在と未来と)
60. The Magician Is Arrested (魔術師捕らわる)
61. Invitation to an Opera (歌劇（オペラ）への招待)
62. Blood Running down the Stairs (Cascade) (血の流水階段（カスケード）)
63. Holy Land (聖地)
64. Holiday’s End (休暇は終わりぬ)
65. Against All Flags (すべての旗に背いて)
66. Under the Golden Lion Flag (Goldenlöwe) (黄金獅子旗（ゴールデンルーヴェ）の下に)
67. Twilight of the Gods (Ragnarok) Again (『神々の黄昏（ラグナロック）』ふたたび)
68. To El Facil (エル・ファシルへ)
69. The Battle to Retake Iserlohn (イゼルローン再奪取作戦)
70. The Prodigal Son Comes Home (蕩児たちの帰宅)
71. The Battle of Mar-Adetta Starzone (beginning) (マル・アデッタ星域の会戦（前）)
72. The Battle of Mar-Adetta Starzone (ending) (マル・アデッタ星域の会戦（後）)
73. The Edict of the Winter Rose Garden (冬バラ園の勅令)
74. The Long Road Ahead (前途遼遠)
75. Rolling Thunder (雷動)
76. Eve of the Festival (祭りの前)
77. To the Windy Corridor (風は回廊へ)
78. Spring Storm (春の嵐)
79. The Battle of the Corridor (beginning): The Invincible and the Undefeated (回廊の戦い（前）～常勝と不敗と～)
80. The Battle of the Corridor (middle): Kaleidoscope (回廊の戦い（中）～万華鏡（カレイドスコープ～)
81. The Battle of the Corridor (ending): End of the Imperial Expedition (回廊の戦い（後）～大親征の終幕～)
82. The Magician Doesn’t Come Back (魔術師、還らず)
83. After the Festival (祭りの後)
84. The Disappointing Triumphal Return (失意の凱旋)
85. The Transfer of the Capital Order (遷都令)
86. New Government in August (8月の新政府（ニュー・ガバメント・イン・オーガスタ）)

Season 4

The 24-episode season 4 (or fourth part), released between September 1996 and March 1997, covers the volumes 9 and 10 of the original novels.

87. Premonition of the Storm (嵐の予感)
88. In the Distant Frontier (辺境にて)
89. Summer’s End Rose (夏の終わりのバラ)
90. Rumbling (鳴動)
91. Burgeoning (発芽)
92. The Urvashi incident (ウルヴァシー事件)
93. For Pride (矜持にかけて)
94. Rebellion Is a Hero’s Privilege (叛逆は英雄の特権)
95. The Two Great Ones Strike at Each Other! (双璧相撃つ!)
96. Live by the Sword… (剣に生き…)
97. Die by the Sword (剣に斃れ)
98. Final Requiem (終わりなき鎮魂曲（レクイエム）)
99. The Approach Run toward the Future (未来への助走)
100. Long Live the Empress! (Hoffe Kaiserin) (皇妃ばんざい!（ホーフ・カイザーリン）)
101. Invitation to Rebellion (動乱への誘い)
102. A Challenge to Arms (敢えて武器を手に)
103. Cosmic Mosaic (コズミック・モザイク)
104. Toward Peace, through Bloodshed (平和へ、流血経由)
105. Planet of Confusion (昏迷の惑星)
106. Holly Palace (Stehibalm Schloss) Burns (柊舘（シュテッヒパルム・シュロス）炎上)
107. The Crimson Star Road (深紅の星路（クリムゾン・スターロード）)
108. Bloodthirsty Maiden (Brünnhilde) (美姫（ブリュンヒルト）は血を欲す)
109. The Golden Lion Flag (Goldenlöwe) Loses its Light (黄金獅子旗（ゴールデンルーヴェ）に光なし)
110. Dream: to See it to the End (夢、見果てたり)

Video games 
Several video games based on Legend of the Galactic Heroes have been released for various platforms, including an online multiplayer strategy game. All of them have been released exclusively in Japan. Most of these games were published by Bothtec and Tokuma Shoten.

PC
 Legend of the Galactic Heroes (1989; PC-9801, PC-8801, X68000, MSX2)
 Legend of the Galactic Heroes: Power-up and Scenario Collection (1989; PC-9801E, PC-8801, X68000, MSX2)
 Legend of the Galactic Heroes II (1990; PC-9801, X68000, MSX2)
 Legend of the Galactic Heroes II DX (1990; PC-9801, X68000, MSX2)
 Legend of the Galactic Heroes III (1993; PC-9801, X68000)
 Legend of the Galactic Heroes III SP (1993; PC-9801, DOS/V, FM Towns, Windows 95)
 Legend of the Galactic Heroes IV (1994; PC-9801)
 Legend of the Galactic Heroes IV EX Kit (1994; PC-9801)
 Legend of the Galactic Heroes IV EX Set (1994; PC-9801)
 Legend of the Galactic Heroes IV EX (1994; Windows 95)
 Legend of the Galactic Heroes V (1998; Windows 95)
 Legend of the Galactic Heroes V grand (1998; Windows 95)
 Legend of the Galactic Heroes VI (2000; Windows 95)
 Legend of the Galactic Heroes VI SG (2000, Windows 98)
 Legend of the Galactic Heroes VS (2003, Windows 98)
 Legend of the Galactic Heroes VII (2004, Windows 2000)
 Legend of the Galactic Heroes (2008, Windows XP)

Consoles
 Legend of the Galactic Heroes  (1988/12/21, Family Computer)
 Legend of the Galactic Heroes  (1992/9/25, Super Famicom)
 Legend of the Galactic Heroes  (1996/12/6, Sega Saturn)
 Legend of the Galactic Heroes Plus (1997/10/23, Sega Saturn)
 Legend of the Galactic Heroes (1998/5/28, PlayStation)
 Chibi Character Game: Legend of the Galactic Heroes (1999/5/27, PlayStation)
 Click Manga: Legend of the Galactic Heroes Vol. 1 (1999/9/30, PlayStation)
 Click Manga: Legend of the Galactic Heroes Vol. 2 (1999/11/18, PlayStation)

Board game 
A board game has been released in 1998.

References

Legend of the Galactic Heroes
Legend of the Galactic Heroes
Legend of the Galactis Heroes